Graham House may refer to:

People
Graham House (cricketer) (born 1950), Australian cricketer

Places

Canada 
Graham House, West Vancouver, British Columbia, by Arthur Erickson, 1963

United States 
(by state then city)
Graham-Gaughan-Betts House, Camden, Arkansas, listed on the National Register of Historic Places (NRHP) in Ouachita County, Arkansas
Fred Graham House, Hardy, Arkansas, listed on the NRHP in Sharp County, Arkansas
Berger-Graham House, Jonesboro, Arkansas, listed on the NRHP in Craighead County, Arkansas
Graham House (Stamford, Connecticut), listed on the NRHP in Fairfield County, Connecticut
Robert Graham House, Newark, Delaware, listed on the NRHP in New Castle County, Delaware
Graham–Ginestra House, Rockford, Illinois, listed on the NRHP in Winnebago County, Illinois
Cong. James M. Graham House, Springfield, Illinois, listed on the NRHP in Sangamon County, Illinois
William H. H. Graham House, Indianapolis, Indiana, NRHP-listed
Robert C. Graham House, Washington, Indiana, listed on the NRHP in Daviess County, Indiana
Seward Graham House, Hiawatha, Kansas, listed on the NRHP in Brown County, Kansas
Graham House (Clay Village, Kentucky), listed on the NRHP in Shelby County, Kentucky
John Graham House, Midway, Kentucky, listed on the NRHP in Woodford County, Kentucky
Graham-Crocker House, Bel Air, Maryland, listed on the NRHP in Maryland
Grahame House, Lower Marlboro, Maryland, NRHP-listed, also known as Graham House, in Calvert County
Graham House (Lowell, Michigan), listed on the NRHP in Kent County, Michigan
Graham House (Rose Hill, Jasper County, Mississippi), listed on the NRHP in Mississippi
Graham House (Kalispell, Montana), listed on the NRHP in Flathead County, Montana
William J. Graham House, Reno, Nevada, listed on the NRHP in Washoe County, Nevada
Graham-Brush Log House, Pine Plains, New York, NRHP-listed, in Dutchess County
William A. Graham Jr. Farm, Kidville, North Carolina, listed on the NRHP in Lincoln County, North Carolina
William Graham House (Wayne, Ohio), listed on the NRHP in Wood County, Ohio
Peters-Graham House, Greensboro, Pennsylvania, listed on the NRHP in Greene County, Pennsylvania
Mentor Graham House, Blunt, South Dakota, listed on the NRHP in Hughes County, South Dakota
Graham House (Brookings, South Dakota), listed on the NRHP in Brookings County, South Dakota
James Graham House, Savannah, Tennessee, listed on the NRHP in Tennessee
Graham-Kivette House, Tazewell, Tennessee, listed on the NRHP in Claiborne County, Tennessee
Dr. L.H. Graham House, Waxahachie, Texas, listed on the NRHP in Ellis County, Texas
Maj. David Graham House, Fosters Falls, Virginia, listed on the NRHP in Wythe County, Virginia
Col. James Graham House, Lowell, West Virginia, NRHP-listed

See also
William Graham House (disambiguation)